Federico Leonardo Díaz (born 14 April 1992) is an Argentine professional footballer who plays as a goalkeeper for Brown de Adrogué.

Career
Díaz's career began with Los Andes, a club he signed for in 1996. He was a professional from 2010 but didn't make an appearance in Primera B Metropolitana. In 2015, Díaz was loaned to Estudiantes. No league matches followed, though he did feature twice in the Copa Argentina versus Dock Sud and San Martín respectively. Having returned to Los Andes, his bow eventually arrived in Primera B Nacional in June 2017 against Flandria; he had been an unused substitute in that division fifty-four times before his debut. Díaz made a total of ten appearances during the 2016–17 campaign.

After a spell at Sportivo Desamparados in 2021, Díaz moved to Primera Nacional club Brown de Adrogué ahead of the 2022 season.

Career statistics
.

References

External links

1992 births
Living people
Footballers from Buenos Aires
Argentine footballers
Association football goalkeepers
Primera Nacional players
Club Atlético Los Andes footballers
Estudiantes de Buenos Aires footballers
Sportivo Desamparados footballers
Club Atlético Brown footballers